Koliellopsis is a genus of green algae in the class Trebouxiophyceae. , AlgaeBase accepted only one species in the genus, Koliellopsis inundata.

References

Trebouxiophyceae genera
Trebouxiophyceae
Monotypic algae genera